Penicillium jiangxiense is a species of the genus of Penicillium which was isolated in Jiangxi in China.

Further reading

References

jiangxiense
Fungi described in 2003